Kota Kinabalu Islamic High School (Malay: Sekolah Menengah Kebangsaan Agama Kota Kinabalu) (SMKAKK) is an Islamic schools in Kota Kinabalu. The school was formerly known as Sekolah Menengah Agama Kota Kinabalu or SMAKK. This school was a very good school.

History 

SMKA Kota Kinabalu was established on 1 December 1990. SMKA Kota Kinabalu was named by the Founding Principal, Haidon Hadi Sapiri, in 1990 in conjunction with the name of the district where this school is situated. In particular, this school is located in Bukit Padang and, until the end of 2015, beside Sabah Science Secondary School. The school campus was originally the Sabah Campus of National University of Malaysia established in 1979 and dissolved years later. 

Establishment of this school was intended by the Sabah State Education Director in order to increase the number of Islamic schools in Sabah. 11 teachers, 1 clerk and 205 students of Form 1 and Form 4 were among the first batch of this school. 

On 12 April 2011, SMKA Kota Kinabalu became a School Without Litter through a proclamation issued by Kota Kinabalu City Hall. In 2016, SMKA Kota Kinabalu becomes an SMKA with the status of Maahad Tahfiz (school of al-Quran memorisation) and, thus, offers Tahfiz programme to students.

Classes 
The name of classes has no turning as the name of classes is usable every year. Currently, the name of classes in the school is Bukhari, Muslim, Abu Daud, Tarmizi, An-Nasaie and Ibnu Majah (obsoleted).

However, the pre-university classes have no name as they use the course taken as the class name.

The school provides pure science stream, computer science stream and basic science stream for Form Four and Form Five; and Usuluddin course and history course for pre-university students.

See also 
 SMKA

References 

Buildings and structures in Kota Kinabalu
Schools in Sabah
Secondary schools in Malaysia